Peter the Deacon (fl. 1115–1159) was the librarian of the abbey of Montecassino and continuator of the Chronicon monasterii Casinensis, usually called the Monte Cassino Chronicle in English. The chronicle was originally written by Leo of Ostia. According to both Chalandon and Lord Norwich, Peter is a poor historian and writer, much inferior to Leo. 

Reputedly a descendant of the Counts of Tusculum, he was offered in 1115 to the monastery of Monte Cassino. About 1127 he was forced to leave the abbey and retired to the neighbouring Atina (Atina, Lazio), because he had supported Abbot Oderisius, who had been deposed by Pope Honorius II.  In 1131 he returned to the abbey owing to the death of Pope Honorius. In 1137, he appeared before Emperor Lothair II, then in Italy, on behalf of his monastery. The sovereign was so pleased with him that he appointed him his chaplain and secretary, and would probably have attached him permanently to his person had not Abbot Wibald considered Peter's return necessary to the abbey. 

In 1131 on his return to Monte Cassino Peter became librarian and keeper of the abbey archives, of which he compiled a cartulary (Registrum Petri Diaconi). Besides editing the existing chronicle of Monte Cassino (and introducing many falsehoods), he wrote several historical works: "De viris illustribus Casinensibus"; "De ortu et obitu justorum Casinensium"; "De Locis sanctis"; Disciplina Casinensis"; "Rhythmus de novissimis diebus". 

After a long period during which historical sources report nothing about him, his name, Petrus Egidii Tusculanensis, last appears in an act of donation of 1154.

His death had to take place after 1159, the initial deadline for the dating of the codex Casinense 47, in whose obituary on February 26 his name is marked (Petrus diaconus et monacus), the only one, among those of many deacons of the same name commemorated there, which appears written in capital letters.

Peter forged, under the name of Gordian, the Passion of St. Placidus. He is vain and occasionally untruthful, but an entertaining writer. His works are in Patrologia Latina, CLXXIII, 763-1144.

Notes

Sources
Leo of Ostia. Chronicon Monasterii Casinensis.
Chalandon, Ferdinand. Histoire de la domination normande en Italie et en Sicilie. Paris, 1906.
Norwich, John Julius. The Normans in the South 1016-1130. Longmans: London, 1967.

12th-century deaths
12th-century Italian historians
Italian chroniclers
Italian Christian monks
Year of birth unknown
Deacons
12th-century Latin writers